is a railway station in the city of Jōetsu, Niigata, Japan.

Lines 
Saigata Station is served by the East Japan Railway Company (JR East) Shinetsu Main Line and is 7.1 kilometers from the terminus of the line at Naoetsu Station.

Station layout
The station has one island platform and one side platform, connected by a footbridge. The station has a Midori no Madoguchi staffed ticket office.

Platforms

History
The station opened on 13 March 1897. With the privatization of Japanese National Railways (JNR) on 1 April 1987, the station came under the control of JR East.

Passenger statistics
In fiscal 2015, the station was used by an average of 700 passengers daily (boarding passengers only).

Surrounding area

 Ogata Post Office

References

External links

 JR East Saigata Station 
 Hokuetsu Express Saigata Station 

Railway stations in Niigata Prefecture
Railway stations in Japan opened in 1897
Stations of Hokuetsu Express
Shin'etsu Main Line
Stations of East Japan Railway Company
Jōetsu, Niigata